The Conditional Access Convention, formally the European Convention on the Legal Protection of Services based on, or consisting of, Conditional Access is a convention of the Council of Europe, which requires its parties to make pieces of software that circumvent paywalls for television and radio programmes as well as "information society services". The convention is based on the Conditional Access Directive which already required European Union Member states to enact similar legislation.

As of September 2015, seven COE members as well as the European Union are party to the convention, covering in total 31 states.

References

Treaties of Bosnia and Herzegovina
Treaties of Finland
Treaties of France
Treaties of Moldova
Treaties of Norway
Treaties of the Netherlands
Treaties of Romania
Treaties of Switzerland
Treaties entered into by the European Union
Treaties concluded in 2001
Treaties entered into force in 2003